According to the Spanish electoral law, a grouping of electors (Spanish: agrupación de electores) is a group of citizens temporarily associated with the goal of presenting a candidature to a particular election. It is a format that a candidature can use to present to a given election. To present the candidature, a candidate must present a minimum number of signatures relative to the electoral census. Given its temporary nature, if the promoters wanted to use the grouping for another election, the latter must be re-constituted. Unlike political parties, party federations or electoral coalitions, a grouping of electors cannot profit from public electoral funding from a preceding candidature.

Signatures

Municipal elections 
As established in the Art. 192 of the electoral law, the required number of signatures depends on the size of the municipality:

 Under 5,000 inhabitants, the number of signatures must be no less than the 1% of voters as long as the number of signataries is over the double of electable councillors.
 Between 5,001 and 10,000 inhabitants, at least 100 signatures
 Between 10,001 and 50,000 inhabitants, at least 500 signatures
 Between 50,001 and 150,000 inhabitants, at least 1,500 signatures
 Between 150,001 and 300,000 inhabitants, at least 3,000 signatures
 Between 300,001 and 1,000,000 inhabitants, at least 5,000 signatures
 In larger areas, at least 8,000 signatures

General elections 
For a group of electors to compete in a given general election, they must present a minimum number of signatures, amounting to 1% of the electors in the electoral district (which correspond to each province and Ceuta and Melilla).

European elections 
For a group of electors to compete in a given election to the European Parliament, they must present a minimum of 15,000 signatures.

References 

Elections in Spain